The Pathogen-Host Interactions database (PHI-base) is a biological database that contains curated information on genes experimentally proven to affect the outcome of pathogen-host interactions.  The database is maintained by researchers at Rothamsted Research, together with external collaborators since 2005. Since April 2017 PHI-base is part of ELIXIR, the European life-science infrastructure for biological information via its ELIXIR-UK node.

Background 
The Pathogen-Host Interactions database was developed to utilise effectively the growing number of verified genes that mediate an organism's ability to cause disease and / or to trigger host responses.

The web-accessible database catalogues experimentally verified pathogenicity, virulence and effector genes from bacterial, fungal and oomycete pathogens which infect animal, plant and fungal hosts. PHI-base is the first on-line resource devoted to the identification and presentation of information on fungal and oomycete pathogenicity genes and their host interactions. As such, PHI-base is a valuable resource for the discovery of candidate targets in medically and agronomically important fungal and oomycete pathogens for intervention with synthetic chemistries and natural products (fungicides).

Each entry in PHI-base is curated by domain experts and supported by strong experimental evidence (gene disruption experiments) as well as literature references in which the experiments are described. Each gene in PHI-base is presented with its nucleotide and deduced amino acid sequence as well as a detailed structured description of the predicted protein's function during the host infection process. To facilitate data interoperability, genes are annotated using controlled vocabularies (Gene Ontology terms, EC Numbers, etc.), and links to other external data sources such as UniProt, EMBL and the NCBI taxonomy services.

Current developments 
Version 4.11 (May 5th, 2021) of PHI-base  provides information on 8070 genes from 276 pathogens and 224 hosts and their impact on 17060 interactions as well on efficacy information on ~20 drugs and the target sequences in the pathogen. PHI-base currently focuses on plant pathogenic and human pathogenic organisms including fungi, oomycetes and bacteria. The entire contents of the database can be downloaded in a tab delimited format. Since 2015 the web-site includes an online literature curation tool called PHI-Canto for community literature curation of various pathogenic species. Since the launch of version 4, the PHI-base is also searchable using  the PHIB-BLAST search tool, which uses the BLAST algorithm to compare a user's sequence against the sequences available from PHI-base. In 2016 the plant portion of PHI-base was used to establish a Semantic PHI-base search tool".

PHI-base is aligned with Ensembl Genomes since 2011, Fungidb since 2016, and Global Biotic Interactions (GloBI) (since August 2018). All new PHI-base releases are integrated by these independent databases. PHI-base has been cited in over 350 peer reviewed publications. Details on all these publications are cited in the ‘about us’ section of the database.

PHI-base is a resource for many applications including:

› The discovery of conserved genes in medically and agronomically important pathogens, which may be potential targets for chemical intervention

› Comparative genome analyses

› Annotation of newly sequenced pathogen genomes

› Functional interpretation of RNA sequencing and microarray experiments

› The rapid cross-checking of phenotypic differences between pathogenic species when writing articles for peer review

PHI-base use has been cited in >500 peer reviewed articles published in International Journals. All these articles are cited in the 'About' section of the database.

Several specific improvements to PHI-base are currently supported. The PhytoPath project develops a bioinformatics resource that integrates genome-scale data from important plant pathogen species with the phenotypes captured in PHI-base. Using the Ensembl Genomes browser, PhytoPath provides access to complete genome assemblies and gene models of priority crop and model-fungal and oomycete phytopathogens. An advanced PhytoPath BioMart search tool allows searches across different species of plant pathogens.

Funding 
PHI-base is a National Capability funded by the Biotechnology and Biological Sciences Research Council (BBSRC), a UK research council.

References

External links 
 PHI-base

Biological interactions
Genetics databases
Genetics in the United Kingdom
Genomics
Online databases
Pathogenic microbes
Plant pathogens and diseases
Rothamsted Experimental Station
Science and technology in Hertfordshire